This is a list of people who have held general officer rank or the rank of brigadier (together now recognized as starred officers) in the British Army, Royal Marines, British Indian Army or other British military force since the Acts of Union 1707.

See also :Category:British generals – note that a "Brigadier" is not classed as a "general" in the British Army, despite being a NATO 1-star equivalent rank. Prior to the mid to late-1990s, British ranks used a hyphen.

Hence, in the lists below:
 1* = Brigadier-General/Brigadier 
 2* = Major-General (prior to 1990s) / Major General (mid 1990s onwards)
 3* = Lieutenant-General (prior to 1990s) / Lieutenant General (mid 1990s onwards)
 4* = General
 5* = Field Marshal

(dates after the name are birth and death)

A

B

C

D

E

F

G

H

I

J

K

L

M

N

O

P

Q 
 Major-General Thomas David Graham Quayle , Royal Artillery
 General Sir Edward Quinan

R

S

T

U 
 Major-General Peter Alfred Ullman (1897—1972) 
 Brigadier-General Percy Umfreville , Royal West Kent Regiment, Military Prisons Director
 Brigadier William Ernest Underhill (1898—1968) 
 Lieutenant-General Sir Herbert Crofton Campbell Uniacke, GOC Royal Artillery
 Brigadier Robert Babington Everard Upton (1896—1977) 
 Lieutenant General Sir Tyrone Urch
 Major-General Robert Elliott Urquhart (1901—1988) 
 Major-General Ronald Urquhart
 Brigadier Thomas Clive Usher (1907—1982) 
 Major-General John Edward Utterson-Kelso  (1893—1972)
 Brigadier Sir Robin Unsworth 1941 to date

V

W

X
Lieutenant-General Sir David Ximenes

Y
Brigadier-General Hon. Henry Yarde-Buller  
Brigadier Morris Yates (1900— )
Briagadier General Clement Yatman, GOC Infantry Brigade
Brigadier Kenneth Darlaston Yearsley (1891— )
Brigadier Herbert Charles James Yeo (1892— )
Major-General Alan Yeoman
Field Marshal Prince Frederick, Duke of York and Albany
Field Marshal Sir Charles Yorke
Major-General the Venerable John Youens
Major-General Alexander Young
Major-General Bernard Keith Young (1892—1969)
Lieutenant-General Sir David Young
Brigadier Desmond Young (1892—1966)
Brigadier Henry Ayerst Young (1895—1952)
Major-General James Young
Brigadier-General Sir Julian Mayne Young (1872—1961)
Major-General Peter Young
Brigadier Peter Young (1915—1988)
Major-General Robert Young, GOC Infantry Brigade
Major-General Elton Younger
Major-General Sir Jack Younger, Baronet.
Major-General John Edward Talbot Younger (1888—1974)
Major-General Ralph Younger (1904—1985)
Major-General Sir George Younghusband
Brigadier George Edward Younghusband (1896—1970)
Field Marshal John French, 1st Earl of Ypres

See also 
List of field marshals of the British Army
List of British Army full generals
List of serving senior officers of the British Army
List of generals of the British Empire who died during the First World War

External links 
 Official website of the British Army

References

Generals
British generals and brigadiers